Bonnington is a village and civil parish in Kent, England.

Bonnington may also refer to:

Places in the United Kingdom 

Bonnington, Edinburgh, within the City of Edinburgh
Bonnington, Scottish Borders, a location near Peebles, Scotland

Other uses 
 Bonnington (sternwheeler), a lake steamer in British Columbia, Canada
 Bonnington Aqueduct, part of the Union Canal west of Edinburgh, Scotland
 Bonnington Chemical Works, a pioneering coal tar processing facility in Edinburgh
 Bonnington Falls, a former waterfall, British Columbia, Canada
 Bonnington Falls, British Columbia, a community, British Columbia, Canada
 Bonnington House, near Wilkieston, West Lothian, Scotland
 Bonnington Pavilion, ruins of an 18th-century Scottish structure
 Bonnington Range, part of the Columbia Mountains in southeastern British Columbia, Canada
 Bonnington Square, square in Vauxhall, London, England

See also
 Bonington (disambiguation)